Homestake Pass is a mountain pass in the Rocky Mountains of Montana in the United States. The pass carries Interstate 90 across the Continental Divide and is the highest point on the 3,020 mi (4,861 km) highway.

The pass was discovered by Edwin Harrison McHenry, a civil engineer working for the Northern Pacific Railway, who was tasked with locating a route for the NP from the main line near Logan, Montana through to Butte. The line over the pass from Logan to Garrison, Montana via Butte became the Rocky Mountain Division, Second and Fourth Subdivisions, built in 1889.  This was Northern Pacific's scenic transcontinental passenger train route used by the famous North Coast Limited and its Amtrak successor, the North Coast Hiawatha, which was discontinued in 1979. The line over the pass is currently owned by BNSF Railway. It has been inactive since 1983, as its grades and curvature are poorly suited to freight trains, which (now operated by Montana Rail Link) utilize the former Northern Pacific's easier route via Helena, crossing the Mullan Pass. It is unlikely that the rail line over the pass will ever be used again, but BNSF has resisted tearing out the line because the original lease with the Northern Pacific and the US Forest Service requires that the grade be returned to its original status, a very costly process. In 2022, with the announced early termination of Montana Rail Link's lease with BNSF, there is speculation that BNSF could re-open the Homestake Pass route to allow for directional running from Garrison to Logan. This would likely entail eastbound empty trains using the steeper and windier Homestake route and loaded westbound trains taking the current route through Helena across Mullan Pass.

When Interstate 90 was built, the state of Montana used Homestake Pass to cross the Continental Divide, thereby providing an easier alternative to the US Route 10 route over the Divide at Pipestone Pass.

A trail running race currently takes place annually on the Continental Divide Trail between Homestake Pass and Pipestone Pass. Hosted by Butte's Piss and Moan Running Club, the Wulfman CDT 14k is held on the Saturday closest to the Summer solstice.

See also
 Mountain passes in Montana

References 

Landforms of Jefferson County, Montana
Mountain passes of Montana
Northern Pacific Railway
Landforms of Silver Bow County, Montana
Great Divide of North America
Rail mountain passes of the United States